There is a very large Mexican American community in the Chicago metropolitan area. Illinois, and Chicago's Mexican American community is the largest outside of the Western United States.

History

The first Mexicans who came to Chicago, mostly entertainers and itinerants, came before the turn of the 20th century. In the mid to late 1910s Chicago had its first significant wave of Mexican immigrants. Originally the immigrants were mostly men working in semiskilled and unskilled jobs who originated from Texas and from Guanajuato, Jalisco, and Michoacán. After immigration was largely reduced in the 1920s, internal migration from the Southwestern United States became the primary driver of Mexican population growth in Chicago.

Circa the 1920s Mexicans were used as a buffer between Whites and Blacks. René Luis Alvarez, a professor at Northeastern Illinois University, stated that Whites perceived Mexicans to be apolitical and docile and treated the people originating from Mexico "with a kind of benign neglect and largely ignored their social needs or living conditions." By the end of the 1930s the Mexican population had declined from 20,000 in the 1920s to 14,000; this was due to repatriations to Mexico in the post-Great Depression; Louise A. N. Kerr of the Illinois Periodicals Online (IPO) of Northern Illinois University Libraries stated that officials "seem to have been" less harsh towards those of Mexican origins compared to officials in areas of the Southwest United States. Circa 1941 the Mexican population had risen to 16,000. During the 1940s braceros were brought to Chicago and became a part of the Mexican-American community.

There were 35,000 people categorized as Spanish-speaking in Chicago by 1950, including Mexicans and Puerto Ricans. In 1960 there were 23,000 Chicagoans who were born in Mexico. In 1970 that number was 47,397, and that year, of all major U.S. cities, Chicago had the fourth-largest Spanish-speaking population; Mexicans made up the majority of Chicago's Hispanophones at that time. From 1960 to 1970 there was an 84% increase in the number of Chicagoans who had at least one parent born in Mexico. In the late 1960s and early 1970s Mexican-origin people in Chicago increasingly became politically active.

Demographics
From the 1990 U.S. Census to the 2000 U.S. Census, the percentage of Mexican Americans in all of Cook County, Illinois increased by 69%, and the percentage of Mexicans in the City of Chicago in particular increased by 50% in the same time period. As a result, Chicago's number of Mexicans surpassed the number in the cities of Houston and San Antonio, Texas.  

As of the 2000 U.S. Census there were 786,000 residents of full or partial Mexican origin in Cook County, giving it the largest ethnic Mexican population in the United States that is not in the Southwest and the third largest ethnic Mexican population of any county after Los Angeles County, California and Harris County, Texas. As of that year the number of ethnic Mexicans in Cook County is greater than that of each of the metropolitan areas of Acapulco, Cuernavaca, Chihuahua, and Veracruz. The total includes over 350,000 residents of the City of Chicago.  

As of the 2010 Census, 961,963 residents of Cook County, including 578,100 residents of the City of Chicago, had full or partial Mexican origins.

Geography

Mexican neighborhoods include Pilsen in the Lower West Side and Little Village in South Lawndale. Pilsen was a historic gateway neighborhood for new immigrants first populated mainly by Germans with some Irish and later by Czechs with other predominantly Slavic peoples (Polish Slovaks, Slovenes, Croats) as well as Austrians and Lithuanians before the arrival of Mexicans in the 1950s.

In the 1990s 40% of the Mexican origin population in Pilsen had migrated directly there from Mexico, and about 33% of the Mexican origin population in the Chicago area lived in Pilsen.

The Mexicans in the Near West Side settled south of Hull House along Halsted and patronized the St. Francis of Assisi church. Beginning in the 1930s the athletic team Saint Francis Wildcats, which had Mexican members, began meeting in the gymnasium of St. Francis of Assisi, and the members moved on to fight in World War II. The Hull House residents were displaced by the 1960s construction of the University of Illinois Chicago, and they moved to Pilsen and/or to suburban communities.

In the post-1920s period the Mexicans in Back of the Yards mostly worked in meatpacking. In 1945 the first Mexican church opened there.

Mexicans began moving into South Chicago in the post-1920s period, and there they stuck to defined neighborhoods and were a part of the working class. They joined area unions by the 1940s.

Institutions

The National Museum of Mexican Art is located in Pilsen.

Mexicans focused on improving their own neighborhoods and establishing their own organizations to do so after the 1920s. Fraternal organizations and mutual aid groups or mutualistas were established; the latter promoted positive views of Mexicans, financially assisted families facing deaths, unemployment, and/or illnesses, and promoted Mexican nationalism.

By the middle of the 20th century newer organizations had been established. The Committee on Mexican American Interests promoted  Mexican American student councils to encourage students to participate in higher education, promoted the G.I. Bill in the post-World War II period, and established a project with the Mexican Community Committee of South Chicago to gather potential recipients of scholarships and applicants to universities, and doing so by asking high school teachers working in Chicago neighborhoods with large numbers of Mexican-origin students to provide lists of names. Circa the middle of the 20th century the Mexican Community Committee of South Chicago and the Mexican Civic Committee of the West Side worked with LULAC to promote the value of getting an education among Mexican-American youth. In general the newer organizations worked within existing power structures to promote education instead of trying to establish their own independent educational programs.

Politics
As of 2001, despite being the largest Hispanic and Latino ethnic group in Chicago, Mexicans have some, but less political representation than Chicago's Puerto Ricans.

Education

Alvarez stated that establishment of the Benito Juarez Community Academy in Pilsen, "[i]n many ways", originated from the Chicano movement and its desire for greater recognition of Mexican-American history and identity. During the opening ceremony, a bust sculpture of Juárez and the flag of Mexico were presented, and the anthems of the United States and of Mexico were both played. The choice of the day of the ceremony was influenced by the fact that September 16 is the anniversary of the Cry of Dolores, the Mexican independence day, as well as near the beginning of the school year in Chicago.

Notable residents
 Sandra Cisneros (author of The House on Mango Street) - Chicago
 Gonzalo P. Curiel (federal judge) - East Chicago, Indiana
 Teresa Fraga (community organizer)
 Luis J. Rodriguez (author of Always Running)

See also

 Puerto Ricans in Chicago

References

Further reading
 Alvarez, René Luis. "A Community that Would Not Take 'No' for an Answer: Mexican Americans, the Chicago Public Schools, and the Founding of Benito Juarez High School" Journal of Illinois History (2014) 17:1 pp 78-98.
 Amezcua, Mike. "A machine in the barrio: Chicago’s conservative colonia and the remaking of Latino politics in the 1960s and 1970s." The Sixties 12.1 (2019): 95-120.

 Andrade, Juan, Jr. "A Historical Survey of Mexican Immigration to the U.S. and an Oral History of the Mexican Settlement in Chicago, 1920–1990" (Ph.D. diss.). Northern Illinois University, 1998.
 Arredondo, Gabriela F. "Navigating ethno-racial currents: Mexicans in Chicago, 1919-1939." Journal of Urban History 30.3 (2004): 399-427.
 Arredondo, Gabriela F. Mexican Chicago: Race, Identity, and Nation, 1916-39 (University of Illinois Press, 2008). excerpt
 Belenchia, Joanne. "Latinos and Chicago politics." in After Daley: Chicago Politics in Transition (1982): 118-45.
 Betancur, John J. "The settlement experience of Latinos in Chicago: Segregation, speculation, and the ecology model." Social Forces 74.4 (1996): 1299-1324.
 Burwell, Rebecca, et al. "The Chicago Latino Congregations Study (CLCS): Methodological Considerations" (University of Notre Dame, Institute for Latino Studies, Center for the Study of Latino Religion, 2010).

 Davalos, KarenMary. "Ethnic Identity among Mexican and Mexican American Women in Chicago, 1920–1991" (Ph.D. diss. Yale University, 1993).
 De Genova, Nicholas. "Race, space, and the reinvention of Latin America in Mexican Chicago." Latin American Perspectives 25.5 (1998): 87-116.
 Farr, Marcia. Latino language and literacy in ethnolinguistic Chicago (Routledge, 2005).
 Fernández, Lilia. Brown in the Windy City: Mexicans and Puerto Ricans in Postwar Chicago (2012). excerpt

 Gómez Zapata, Tania. "Civil Society as an Advocate of Mexicans and Latinos in the United States: The Chicago Case." in Latin American Diasporas in Public Diplomacy (Palgrave Macmillan, Cham, 2021) pp. 189-213.
 Innis-Jiménez, Michael. Steel Barrio: The Great Mexican Migration to South Chicago, 1915–1940 (New York University Press, 2013). excerpt; also see online review
 Kerr, Louise Ano Nuevo. “Chicano Settlements in Chicago: A Brief History,” Journal of Ethnic Studies (winter 1975).
 Kerr, Louise Año Nuevo. "Mexican Chicago: Chicano Assimilation Aborted, 1939-1954." in The Ethnic Frontier, ed. by Melvin G. Holli and Peter Jones, (Eerdman's, 1977) pp: 294-328.
 Kerr, Louise Ano Nuevo. "The Chicano Experience in Chicago, 1920-1970" (PhD disst. University of Illinois at Chicago, 1976).

 Padilla, Felix M. Latino ethnic consciousness: the case of Mexican Americans and Puerto Ricans in Chicago (University of Notre Dame Press, 1985).
 Pallares, Amalia, and Nilda Flores-González, eds. ¡Marcha!: Latino Chicago and the immigrant rights movement (University of Illinois Press, 2010).
 Paral, Rob, et al. "Latino demographic growth in metropolitan Chicago." (University of Notre Dame, Institute for Latino Studies, Center for the Study of Latino Religion, 2004) online.
 Ramírez, Leonard G., et al. Chicanas of 18th Street: Narratives of a movement from Latino Chicago (University of Illinois Press, 2011).

 Ruiz, Vicki L., et al. Pots of promise: Mexicans and pottery at Hull-House, 1920-40 (University of Illinois Press, 2004). excerpt

External links
 "Historian Studies Impact of Mexican Immigrants in Chicago" (Archive). University of Notre Dame College of Arts and Letters.

Hispanic and Latino American culture in Chicago
Mexican
Chicago
 
Mexican-American history